Vienna DC Timberwolves is an Austrian basketball club based in Wien. Since the 2018–19 season, the Timberwolves play in the Austrian Basketball Superliga (BSL), the highest tier in Austrian basketball. The Timberwolves are three-times Austrian Second League winners.

The club was founded on 21 June 1957 as the basketball section of WAT Stadlau, which was established two years earlier. In 1972, the club separated from the WAT Stadlau Omnisport club and became WAT Donaustadt. The first president of the club was Ferdinand Stadelmayer. In the 2014–15 season, the Timberwolves won the 2.ÖBL but was not able to promote as it lost to UBSC Graz in the promotion playoffs. Jakob Pöltl played in the Wolves youth sections during his younger years, from 2009 to 2016.

Trophies
Austrian Second League
Winners (3): 2009–10, 2014–15, 2017-18

Season by season

Notes

References

Basketball teams in Austria
Basketball teams established in 1957
Sport in Vienna